The following is a list of unproduced Steven Spielberg projects in roughly chronological order. During his long career, American film director Steven Spielberg has worked on a number of projects which never progressed beyond the pre-production stage under his direction. Some of these projects fell in "development hell" or were officially canceled, some were turned over to other production teams, and still others never made it past the speculative stage.

Unrealized projects

Flushed with Pride: The Story of Thomas Crapper 
At the beginning of the 1970s, Spielberg tried to greenlight the production of Flushed with Pride: The Story of Thomas Crapper, the semi-satirical biography of Thomas Crapper, who, as the book suggested, invented the flushing toilet. Spielberg approached screenwriters Gloria Katz and Willard Huyck to write the script. However, the film was never made due to various problems, so Spielberg left the project to direct The Sugarland Express.

Close Encounters of the Third Kind 2 
In late 1977, after the successful reception of Close Encounters of the Third Kind, Spielberg expressed interest in filming a sequel or a prequel. However, he later refused the idea, because he felt that "The army's knowledge and ensuing cover-up is so subterranean that it would take a creative screen story, perhaps someone else making the picture and giving it the equal time it deserves". He also didn't want developer Columbia Pictures to make a sequel without him, which had happened with Universal Pictures' Jaws.

Night Skies 

After his decision not to make a sequel to Close Encounters of the Third Kind, Spielberg started the development of his next project, a science fiction horror film entitled Night Skies, whose concept was pitched by him during the development of Close Encounters. The film was intended to be a spiritual follow-up to Close Encounters. Lawrence Kasdan was attached to write the screenplay. However, the film wasn't made, although the main concept was the inspiration of two Spielberg's films: Poltergeist and E.T. the Extra-Terrestrial (although the first wasn't directed by Spielberg).

Blackhawk 
In the early 1980s, Spielberg announced that he had plans to direct a film adaptation of the Blackhawk comic book series. Dan Aykroyd was attached to play Blackhawk. However, the project never materialized and Spielberg chose to direct Raiders of the Lost Ark. In April 2018, new development emerged when it was announced that Spielberg will produce/direct a new film adaptation of Blackhawk for Warner Bros., with the screenplay being written by David Koepp. Spielberg will co-produce the film with Kristie Macosko Krieger and Sue Kroll.

In 2021, a fan unearthed a now deleted Instagram post from David Koepp stating that the film is still in development and that Steven Spielberg is still attached. The title is currently Blackhawks

Reel to Reel 
Around 1980, during the filming of Raiders of the Lost Ark, Spielberg contacted Gary David Goldberg to make a semiautobiographical musical film entitled Reel to Reel. The film's plot would have been surrounding a filmmaker named Stuart Moss, and his direction of a musical remake of Invaders From Mars. The film was officially announced in production in 1983, but Spielberg finally abandoned the project and chose to direct Indiana Jones and the Temple of Doom.  According to the Los Angeles Times, the film was to have been directed by Michael Cimino and distributed by Columbia Pictures.

The Talisman 
Spielberg has made several attempts to make a film adaptation of Stephen King and Peter Straub's 1984 novel The Talisman ever since he and Universal Pictures bought the film rights in 1982.  In the mid-2000s, Spielberg almost adapted The Talisman into a six-hour miniseries for TNT.

E.T. II: Nocturnal Fears 
In July 1982, Spielberg hired E.T. the Extra-Terrestrial writer Melissa Mathison to write a script for a sequel film, entitled E.T. II: Nocturnal Fears. The film's plot would have shown Elliott and his friends getting kidnapped by evil aliens and follow their attempts to contact E.T. for help. However, Spielberg finally decided to cancel the sequel's production, feeling it "would do nothing but rob the original of its virginity".

Why Can't I Be Audrey Hepburn? 
According to Ryan Murphy on his appearance on the radio program Fresh Air with Terry Gross, Ryan sold a script he made for Spielberg called Why Can't I Be Audrey Hepburn? about a woman obsessed with famous film actress Audrey Hepburn who has left at the altar who then meets a man just as Audrey-centric as she. The film was going to star Téa Leoni and Jennifer Love Hewitt as different roles. Spielberg was interested in making it, but the film's production was canceled after nothing new came out of it and Spielberg had a lot of other projects in the 1990s he was busy working on.

Early attempt of The Martian Chronicles 
In 1997, Steven Spielberg and John Davis were producing a film adaptation of Ray Bradbury's The Martian Chronicles, with Michael Tolkin and John Orloff were some of the writers who worked on a script, which failed to get off the ground for Universal Pictures. In 2011, Paramount Pictures acquired the film rights and will produce a film franchise with only Davis producing through Davis Entertainment.

The Mark 
In January 1998, Spielberg signed on to direct Rob Liefeld's spec script The Mark, with Will Smith set to star, until Smith told Liefeld that Spielberg dropped out due to production and merchandising complications, which Liefeld revealed on a 2015 Twitter thread.

I'll Be Home 
In 1999, Spielberg announced that he was working on an autobiographical film, entitled I'll Be Home, written by his sister Anne. Spielberg himself, in collaboration with Tony Kushner, later wrote the 2022 autobiographical film The Fabelmans.

The Curse of Monkey Island 
In the start of 2000, Spielberg was set to make his first animated feature film based on the Lucasarts video game series Monkey Island, a game series he was a fan of at the time. Spielberg was set to direct, produce and co-write the screenplay with Ted Elliott, with concept arts by the original game's designer Steve Purcell and animator Tony Stacchi, executive produced by Steven's best friend and founder of the game's developer George Lucas.

Ghost Soldiers 
On January 24, 2002, it was reported that Spielberg will direct an adaptation of Hampton Sides's book Ghost Soldiers with Josh Friedman writing the script and Tom Cruise was set to star in and produce the film.

Arkansas 
In August 2002, Empire cited the abandoned western Arkansas that Spielberg was involved and Tom Cruise was in talks to star in the film.

The Rivals 
On May 21, 2003, Spielberg was set to direct and produce the film The Rivals for Paramount Pictures. It was revealed that Nicole Kidman and Gwyneth Paltrow were set to play Sarah Bernhardt and Eleanor Duse, until Marion Cotillard replaced Paltrow. In 2008, Spielberg left the project due to DreamWorks Pictures' split from Paramount, which still has the project.

The Catcher in the Rye 
It was reported in 2003 that Spielberg attempted to direct a film adaptation of J. D. Salinger's novel The Catcher in the Rye but could not obtain the rights from J. D. Salinger.

Chocky 
In September 2008, The Hollywood Reporter reported that Spielberg had acquired the rights of John Wyndham's novelette Chocky  to make a film adaptation of it. However, no updates were made after this announcement.

Horace Greasley biopic 
On June 15, 2009, it was reported that Spielberg was to make a film about British Army private Horace Greasley, who claimed to have secretly escaped and returned to Nazi German prisoner-of-war camps 200 times during World War II. However, no updates were made after this announcement.

Martin Luther King biopic 
On May 19, 2009, it was reported that Spielberg was to make a film about the life of civil rights activist Martin Luther King Jr. after buying the rights to his life story. Spielberg said of the project in 2013, "I wouldn't call it a biopic, it's more a story of King and the movement and also about how his admiration for Mahatma Gandhi helped to shape his moral core." As of March 15, 2018, Spielberg still holds the rights to King's story.

Harvey 
On August 2, 2009, Spielberg stated that he would direct a film adaptation of the play Harvey. Will Smith, Robert Downey Jr. and Tom Hanks were considered to play the lead role, while Jonathan Tropper was hired to write the screenplay. DreamWorks and 20th Century Fox would have developed the film. However, Collider confirmed on December 4, 2009 that the project was cancelled due to problems with the lead role selection.

Pirate Latitudes 
In August 2009, Spielberg announced his intention to adapt the novel to film, reportedly having wanted to make a pirate film. Spielberg hired David Koepp to pen the screenplay. Anil Ambani's Reliance Big Entertainment and Spielberg's DreamWorks Studios will produce the film, which will be the third of Crichton's novels Spielberg has adapted, after the highly successful Jurassic Park films. This project is still in development.

George Gershwin biopic
On January 31, 2010, it was reported that Spielberg was going to direct a biopic about the life of composer George Gershwin with Zachary Quinto portraying him. Principal photography for the biopic was slated to begin in April that same year, but it never came to fruition. On February 20, 2013, it was reported that Spielberg was still interested in making a biopic about Gershwin's life.

A Steady Rain 
On July 21, 2011, it was reported that Spielberg was going to direct the film adaptation of Keith Huff's A Steady Rain with Hugh Jackman set to reprise his role.

The Kidnapping of Edgardo Mortara 
On April 11, 2016, it was announced that Spielberg was going to direct a film adaptation of David Kertzer's book The Kidnapping of Edgardo Mortara, with Tony Kushner serving as screenwriter and Mark Rylance portraying Pope Pius IX.  The book is based on the true story of Jewish-Italian Edgardo Mortara, who was kidnapped and forced to convert to the Catholic Church. Oscar Isaac was to have portrayed Mortara in Spielberg’s movie. Spielberg planned to start filming in February 2017 but after having trouble finding a six-year-old boy to play the film's lead, he cancelled the project in favor of directing The Post (2017) upon reading Liz Hannah and Josh Singer's script.

Ulysses S. Grant biopic 
On May 17, 2018 it was announced Spielberg was negotiating to direct a biographic of President Ulysses S. Grant which would see Leonardo DiCaprio play Grant. Since then, no new announcements on the project have been made.

Calvin and Hobbes 
Like many filmmakers, particularly George Lucas and Jim Henson, Spielberg attempted to obtain the rights to the popular daily comic strip Calvin and Hobbes but was turned down by the comics’ creator, Bill Watterson.

Abandoned projects

Cruising 

In the early 1970s, film producer Philip D'Antoni hired Spielberg to direct a film adaptation of Gerald Walker's novel Cruising.  Spielberg was reportedly attached to the project for three years before officially dropping out.   According to D'Antoni, "We just couldn’t come up with a script that met with my satisfaction... So we decided to abandon the project, and figured we’d go on to do something else together some other day, and Steven went back to LA.”  The film adaptation was eventually directed by William Friedkin.

Rain Man 

Spielberg was among the few filmmakers attached to direct Rain Man prior to Barry Levinson's official involvement.  It was Spielberg who convinced screenwriter Ronald Bass to make the character of Raymond Babbitt as an autistic savant.  Spielberg dropped out as he was obligated to direct Indiana Jones and the Last Crusade,  but has also since expressed regret for not having directed Rain Man.

Who Discovered Roger Rabbit 
In 1989, Spielberg discussed with J. J. Abrams the possibility of making a sequel to the successful Who Framed Roger Rabbit feature film. The sequel's plot would have been Roger Rabbit, Baby Herman, and Richie Davenport traveling west to seek Roger's mother, in the process meeting Jessica Krupnick (Roger's future wife), a struggling Hollywood actress. While Roger and Ritchie are enlisting in the Army, Jessica is kidnapped and forced to make pro-Nazi Germany broadcasts. The film would also have been the first true film from Amblin Entertainment's animation division Amblimation. However, after directing Schindler's List, Spielberg refused to direct any films satirizing the Nazis.

As of 2016, Zemeckis thinks that the chances of Disney green-lighting the sequel are "slim". As he explained more in detail, "The current corporate Disney culture [the current studio management of The Walt Disney Company] has no interest in Roger, and they certainly don't like Jessica at all."

Howard Hughes biopic 
In 1990, Spielberg was attached to direct Warren Beatty in a biopic about Howard Hughes that was written by Bo Goldman.  The film was eventually made without Spielberg's involvement and released in 2016 under the title Rules Don't Apply.

Cape Fear 

In the early stages of development, Spielberg was slated to direct the remake of the 1962 film Cape Fear whereas Martin Scorsese would direct Schindler's List (1993).  Had Spielberg directed, he envisioned the roles of Max Cady and Sam Bowden to be portrayed by Bill Murray and Harrison Ford respectively.  Spielberg eventually decided to swap projects with Scorsese in favor of directing Schindler's List instead.  Although he was uncredited, Spielberg did remain as a producer of the remake.

The Curious Case of Benjamin Button 

In 1991, Spielberg was slated to make a film adaptation of F. Scott Fitzgerald's 1922 short story The Curious Case of Benjamin Button for Universal Pictures, with Tom Cruise playing the titular role.  However, Spielberg dropped out due to his commitment with the films Hook (1991), Jurassic Park (1993) and Schindler's List (1993).

Shrek 

Also in 1991, Spielberg bought the rights to William Steig's 1990 children's book Shrek!. Spielberg originally envisioned his adaptation as a traditional animated film from Amblin Entertainment, with Bill Murray as the voice of the titular character and Steve Martin as the voice of Donkey.  Despite co-founding DreamWorks Animation—the eventual owner of the Shrek franchise—in 1994, Spielberg moved on to other projects.

The Little Things 

Spielberg was attached to direct the film in 1993, with John Lee Hancock writing the screenplay. Spielberg would exit the project deeming the story too dark. Hancock would assume the director chair himself and the film would be released in 2021 starring Denzel Washington, Rami Malek and Jared Leto.

Meet the Parents 

It was reported that back in 1996, Spielberg was slated to direct Jim Carrey in a remake of Greg Glienna's 1992 film Meet the Parents for Universal Pictures.  However, Spielberg, along with Carrey, left the project due to schedule conflicts.  Spielberg's company DreamWorks served as a co-distributor of the 2000 remake.

Memoirs of a Geisha 

Although he served as a producer of the film, Spielberg initially wanted to direct the adaptation of Arthur Golden's novel Memoirs of a Geisha following its 1997 publication.  He decided not to direct it when he agreed to direct A.I. Artificial Intelligence instead.

Early attempt of Mozart and the Whale

Inspector Gadget 
Prior to the release of the 1999 Disney film Inspector Gadget, Spielberg was at one point slated to produce a film adaptation of the 1980s animated series of the same name.

The Haunting 

Stephen King recalled in the late 1990s that Spielberg attempted to direct a remake of the 1963 film, with Stephen King serving as screenwriter.  However, King left the project due to creative differences with Spielberg.  As a result, Jan De Bont directed the film instead and Spielberg's studio DreamWorks distributed it.

Harry Potter and the Philosopher's Stone 

Prior to Chris Columbus's official involvement, Spielberg was considered to direct Harry Potter and the Philosopher's Stone.  Spielberg stated in 2012, "I was offered Harry Potter.  I developed it for about five or six months with Steve Kloves, and then I dropped out."  Spielberg wanted to combine the Harry Potter books into an animated film, but Warner Bros. president Alan F. Horn objected.  Spielberg also wanted Haley Joel Osment to portray the titular character.  Spielberg ultimately backed out as director due to creative differences with J. K. Rowling.  He went on to direct A.I. Artificial Intelligence instead.

Big Fish 

In August 2000, Spielberg was in talks to direct an adaptation of Daniel Wallace's novel Big Fish: A Novel of Mythic Proportions.  Spielberg reportedly wanted Jack Nicholson to portray Edward Bloom.  However, he dropped out of the project and was replaced by Tim Burton, who ended up directing the film.

The Trial of the Chicago 7 

In July 2007, Sorkin wrote a script entitled The Trial of the Chicago 7, based on the conspiracy trial of the Chicago 7. Producers Spielberg, Walter F. Parkes, and Laurie MacDonald collaborated on the development of Sorkin's script, with Spielberg intending to direct the film. Sacha Baron Cohen was originally cast as Abbie Hoffman, while Spielberg approached Will Smith for the role of Bobby Seale, and planned to meet with Heath Ledger about playing Tom Hayden. The Writers Guild of America strike, which started in November 2007 and lasted 100 days, delayed filming and the project was suspended, until October 2018, Sorkin was announced as the director of the film.

Interstellar 

The film began development in June 2006, when Spielberg and Paramount Pictures announced plans for a science fiction film based on an eight-page treatment written by Lynda Obst and Kip Thorne. Obst was attached to produce. By March 2007, Jonathan Nolan was hired to write a screenplay. After Spielberg moved his production studio DreamWorks from Paramount to Walt Disney Studios in 2009, Paramount needed a new director for Interstellar. Jonathan Nolan recommended his brother Christopher Nolan, who joined the project in 2012.

Oldboy 

Spielberg was attached to adapt the manga Old Boy in the late 2000s. Will Smith was set to star and it was reported to be based on the manga not the earlier film adaptation. The project was abandoned due to rights issues. The film ended up being released on November 27, 2013 directed by Spike Lee and starring Josh Brolin.

Robopocalypse 
On October 22, 2010, Spielberg had signed on to direct a film adaptation of Daniel H. Wilson's novel Robopocalypse. Chris Hemsworth, Anne Hathaway, and Ben Whishaw had signed on to star in the film. However, on January 9, 2013, Robopocalypse was placed on hold indefinitely mainly because of its production expenses. The next day, Spielberg clarified he was working on a new script that would be "more economically but also much more personally". In July 2015, concept artwork was leaked onto the Internet. On March 7, 2018, Michael Bay signed on to direct the adaptation.

Gods and Kings 

On November 15, 2011, it was reported that Spielberg was in talks with Warner Bros. to direct Gods and Kings, a biopic about the life of Moses.  On March 4, 2013, it was confirmed that Spielberg dropped out of the project.

American Sniper 

On May 2, 2013, it was announced that Spielberg had signed on to direct the film adaption of Chris Kyle's 2012 autobiography American Sniper.  However, on August 5 that same year, it was announced that Spielberg left the project due to a budget disagreement between him and Warner Bros.

Thank You For Your Service 

On June 4, 2013, it was first reported that Spielberg was considering to direct a film adaptation of David Finkel's 2013 nonfiction book Thank You for Your Service, with Daniel Day-Lewis attached to star.  Then, on February 20, 2015, it was reported that Spielberg might direct the film later that year.  Finally, in June 2015, it was officially announced that the film's screenwriter Jason Hall would direct the film after Hall convinced Spielberg to let him direct.

It's What I Do 
On March 2, 2015, Spielberg had signed on to direct a film adaptation of Lynsey Addario's memoir It's What I Do: A Photographer's Life of Love and War, with Jennifer Lawrence set to star as Addario. However, Spielberg and Lawrence moved on from the film. On October 24, 2018, Ridley Scott signed on to direct, with Scarlett Johansson set to star as Addario, until Johansson dropped out the following day after finding out it was funded by the Saudi crown prince, Mohammed bin Salman.

Indiana Jones 5 

On February 26, 2020, it was reported that Spielberg chose not to direct the fifth Indiana Jones film, as he wanted to "pass along Indy’s whip to a new generation to bring their perspective to the story". James Mangold took over as director, with Spielberg remaining involved in the film as producer, while Ford starred as Jones.

Offers

White Lightning 
Spielberg has confirmed that he turned down the offer to direct White Lightning (1973) in favor of directing The Sugarland Express (1974) instead.

Ace Eli and Rodger of the Skies 

Spielberg was turned down by Richard D. Zanuck to direct Ace Eli and Rodger of the Skies.

MacArthur 

Spielberg turned down the offer to direct MacArthur, a biopic about the life of Douglas MacArthur.

The Taking of Pelham One Two Three 

Spielberg also turned down the offer to direct The Taking of Pelham One Two Three (1974).

The Bingo Long Traveling All-Stars & Motor Kings 

Spielberg expressed interest in directing The Bingo Long Traveling All-Stars & Motor Kings (1976), but opted to direct Jaws instead.

Lucky Lady 

Spielberg was considered to direct Lucky Lady for 20th Century Fox.  The script was written by Huyck and Katz and Paul Newman was to have starred in the film had Spielberg directed.  However, Spielberg could not direct the film due to his commitment with Jaws.

Superman 

Around 1975, after the success of Jaws, Alexander Salkind and his son Ilya wanted to hire Spielberg to direct Superman, the first theatrical movie based on the Superman comic book series. However, due to Spielberg's commitment to Close Encounters of the Third Kind, the Salkinds finally hired Richard Donner to direct the film.

The Spy Who Loved Me and Moonraker 

In 1975 Steven Spielberg called Albert R. Broccoli offering to direct The Spy Who Loved Me, but was turned down. In 1978, after the successful release of Close Encounters of the Third Kind, he offered to direct a second time on Moonraker. Afterwards he became uninterested in directing any James Bond films.

Magic 
In the late 1970s, Spielberg expressed interest in directing a film adaptation of William Goldman's novel Magic and considered casting Robert De Niro for the lead role.  The film ended up being directed by Richard Attenborough and Spielberg admitted, "...I went to see the picture and realized that it was a hell of a lot better than what I would have done."

Three Amigos 

After he finished Raiders of the Lost Ark, Spielberg almost planned to direct the comedy Three Amigos next, with Steve Martin, Bill Murray and Robin Williams as the leads. He chose to direct E.T. the Extra-Terrestrial instead.

Big 

In addition to Rain Man, Spielberg's commitment to Indiana Jones and the Last Crusade also caused him to turn down the offer to direct Big (1988), which was co-written by his sister, Anne Spielberg.

The Truman Show 

Spielberg was among the list of filmmakers considered to direct the film before Peter Weir officially assumed the position.

The Secret Life of Walter Mitty 
John Goldwyn recalled in the spring of 2003 that Spielberg expressed interest in directing the remake of The Secret Life of Walter Mitty (1947) for Paramount Pictures on condition that Jim Carrey play the titular role. However, Paramount put the project in turnaround by the end of 2003.  The film was eventually remade in 2013, with Ben Stiller serving as director in addition to playing the titular role.

References 

Unrealized
Spielberg, Steven